Lawrence E. Corbett Jr. (May 11, 1921 – October 20, 2020) was an American politician who served in the New York State Assembly from 1963 to 1972.

He died in October 2020 at the age of 99.

References

1921 births
2020 deaths
Republican Party members of the New York State Assembly